The Sumner–White Dipping Vat is a historic concrete cattle dipping vat in Ashley County, Arkansas.  It is located about four miles northeast of the intersection
of U.S. Highway 82 and County Road 69, half a mile in the woods northeast of the Sumner-White Hunt Club. It was probably built c. 1915, when a statewide program was initiated for the eradication of Texas tick fever. The facilities were likely used until the program came to an end in 1943.

The vat and associated U-shaped structure were listed on the National Register of Historic Places in 2006.

See also
National Register of Historic Places listings in Ashley County, Arkansas

References

Agricultural buildings and structures on the National Register of Historic Places in Arkansas
Buildings and structures completed in 1915
National Register of Historic Places in Ashley County, Arkansas
1915 establishments in Arkansas
Plunge dips